Antonella Mularoni (born 27 September 1961) is a Sammarinese politician who was Captain Regent of San Marino from April 2013 until October 2013 (alongside Denis Amici) and Secretary for Foreign Affairs. She was the Sammarinese judge for the European Court of Human Rights. She graduated in law from Bologna University.

Honors 

  Order of Merit of the Italian Republic (Italy, 2014)

References
Leadership Directory: Antonella Mularoni
CIA - The World Factbook, Executive branch:MULARONI
Third Annual San Marino-UNICEF Awards honour children’s advocacy groups 
Antonella Mularoni: Candidata Alleanzapopolare Elezioni 2008

1961 births
People from the City of San Marino
21st-century women politicians
Captains Regent of San Marino
Members of the Grand and General Council
Female foreign ministers
Female heads of state
Judges of the European Court of Human Rights
Living people
Sammarinese judges
Secretaries of State for Foreign and Political Affairs of San Marino
Secretaries of State for Communication of San Marino
Secretaries of State for Transport of San Marino
Women judges
Women government ministers of San Marino
Sammarinese women diplomats
Sammarinese judges of international courts and tribunals
University of Bologna alumni